Pancrates (fl. c. 140 AD) of Athens, was a Cynic philosopher. Philostratus relates, that when the celebrated sophist Lollianus was in danger of being stoned by the Athenians in a tumult about bread, Pancrates quieted the mob by exclaiming that Lollianus was not a "bread-dealer" but a "word-dealer". Alciphron also mentions a Cynic philosopher of this name in his fictitious letters.

Notes

2nd-century Athenians
2nd-century philosophers
Roman-era Cynic philosophers
Roman-era Athenian philosophers